Helen Westcott (born Myrthas Helen Hickman, January 1, 1928 – March 17, 1998) was an American stage and screen actress and former child actress. She is best known for her work in The Gunfighter (1950).

Early years
Westcott was the daughter of singer Hazel Beth McArthur and  Warner Bros. studio actor Gordon Westcott. Her father died when Helen was seven years old, in 1935. 

When she was two, Westcott appeared in vaudeville with her mother. At age seven, she began a nine-year run playing the daughter on stage in a production of The Drunkard in Los Angeles.

Westcott attended Los Angeles City College.

Film 
When Westcott was 4 years old, she appeared in a series of short films. At 5, she appeared in the full-length Thunder Over Texas. She appeared opposite Gregory Peck in the western classic The Gunfighter released in 1950. She was also known in part for her role in Charles Lamont's 1953 comedy horror film Abbott and Costello Meet Dr. Jekyll and Mr. Hyde.

Television

Westcott moved from the big screen to television roles in the late 1950s. In 1958 she appeared on Perry Mason as murderer Marcia Greeley in "The Case of the Haunted Husband." She also made guest appearances on Bonanza, The Twilight Zone and Wanted Dead Or Alive.

Later years
Westcott also appeared on the stage later in her career, as well as in films including Anthony Mann's God's Little Acre in 1958.

Personal life
Westcott wed actor Don Gordon on February 18, 1948. In 1950, they had a daughter, Jennifer. They were divorced in 1953.

Westcott was a registered Republican and a member of the Church of Jesus Christ of Latter-day Saints.

Death
Westcott died of cancer in Edmonds, Washington on March 17, 1998. Her body was cremated.

Filmography

Source: The Encyclopedia of Fantastic Film: Ali Baba to Zombies

References

External links
 
 
 

1928 births
1998 deaths
20th-century American actresses
20th-century American singers
Actresses from California
American child actresses
American film actresses
American television actresses
Deaths from cancer in Washington (state)
People from Greater Los Angeles
Western (genre) film actresses
American Latter Day Saints